By-Wy Creek is a stream in the U.S. state of Mississippi. It is a tributary to Biba Wila Creek.

By-Wy Creek is a name derived from the Choctaw language meaning "leaning white oak".

References

Rivers of Mississippi
Rivers of Oktibbeha County, Mississippi
Mississippi placenames of Native American origin